William David Quinlan (June 19, 1932 – November 10, 2015) was an American football defensive end who played in the National Football League (NFL) for the Cleveland Browns, Green Bay Packers, Philadelphia Eagles, Detroit Lions, and the Washington Redskins.  He also played in the Canadian Football League (CFL) for the Hamilton Tiger-Cats.  Quinlan played college football at Michigan State University and was drafted in the third round of the 1956 NFL Draft.

Early life
Quinlan was born in Lawrence, Massachusetts and attended Lawrence High School, where he lettered in football, basketball, and baseball.  After graduating high school in 1951, Quinlan attended Staunton Military Academy in 1952 and was inducted into their Hall of Fame.

College career
Quinlan attended and played college football at Michigan State University.

Professional career
After graduating from Michigan State, Quinlan played for the Hamilton Tiger-Cats of the Canadian Football League in 1954.  He was then drafted in the third round (37th overall) of the 1956 NFL Draft by the Cleveland Browns.  He joined the Browns in 1957 after serving in the United States Army in 1956.  He was traded to the Green Bay Packers in 1959, along with Lew Carpenter, in return for Billy Howton.  In 1963, The Packers traded Quinlan and defensive back John Symank to the New York Giants for a high draft pick.  The Giants immediately traded Quinlan to the Philadelphia Eagles in exchange for defensive end Gene Gossage.

Personal life
Quinlan's father died when he was four years old, and his mother raised seven children.  Quinlan died on November 10, 2015 in Methuen, Massachusetts. He lived in Lawrence, Massachusetts with his wife, Betty, and had previously survived cancer. Bill Quinlan is survived by his wife Betty and their four children, Bill Quinlan Jr. and his wife Angela, Melinda and her husband Michael Tulley, Sean Quinlan, and Mary Ellen and her husband Steve Joncas. He is also survived by his grandchildren Melissa, Lauren and her Husband Jason Messina, and Michael Tulley, Shannon and Kailee Joncas, and Ryan and Sophia Quinlan. Bill Quinlan also has two great-grandchildren, Brianna and Ava.

References

1932 births
2015 deaths
American football defensive ends
Cleveland Browns players
Detroit Lions players
Green Bay Packers players
Hamilton Tiger-Cats players
Michigan State Spartans football players
Philadelphia Eagles players
Washington Redskins players
Sportspeople from Lawrence, Massachusetts
Players of American football from Massachusetts
Lawrence High School (Massachusetts) alumni